My, I'm Large is the second a cappella album by the Bobs released in 1987. Though considered a studio album, four tracks were culled from live performances. The album included cover versions of Smokey Robinson's "You've Really Got a Hold on Me" and Sam the Sham and the Pharaohs' "Little Red Riding Hood".

Track listing 
All songs written by Gunnar Madsen and Richard Greene except as indicated:

 "My, I'm Large" – 3:57
 "Helmet" – 3:03
 "My Husband was a Weatherman" (live) – 3:23 
 "Mopping, Mopping, Mopping" – 4:04
 "Bulky Rhythm" (live) – 3:02
 "You've Really Got a Hold on Me" (Smokey Robinson) – 3:42
 "Johnny's Room" – 2:30
 "Please Let Me Be Your Third World Country" – 3:26
 "Valentino's" (live) – 3:20
 "Banana Love" – 2:51
 "Little Red Riding Hood" (live) (Ron Blackwell) – 3:08
 "My Shoes" (Gunnar Madsen, Richard Greene, Mark Pritchard) – 4:44

Personnel 
 Gunnar "Bob" Madsen – vocals
 Matthew "Bob" Stull – vocals
 Janie "Bob" Scott – vocals
 Richard "Bob" Greene – vocals

References

External links
[ The Bobs] at Allmusic.com

The Bobs albums
1987 albums